Ikhtiyar al-Din Hasan ibn Ghafras or Ikstiyar al-Din Hasan ibn Gavras (died 1192) was a courtier and long-time vizier of the Seljuk Sultan of Iconium, Kilij Arslan II (reigned 1156–1192).

He was a member of the Byzantine Gabras family, very likely identical with, or possibly the son of, an unnamed member of the family who defected to the Sultan in the late reign of Emperor Manuel I Komnenos (r. 1143–1180), became a leading member of the Seljuk court, and served as the Seljuk ambassador to the Emperor during the Myriokephalon campaign of 1175–76. Ikthyar himself is safely attested from ca. 1180 on, when he led negotiations with Saladin. He held the post of vizier until Kilij Arslan's death in 1192. According to A. Bryer, he was "regarded as a wise statesman and noted for the splendour of his robes and personal jewelry". Nevertheless, it is possible that he (or a possible son) is the "Ghawras" who was accused of poisoning the Sultan and his heir, Kaykhusraw I, in 1192. After Kilij Arslan's death, he was dismissed from his office and made for his estates near Erzincan, where he intended to retire, but was waylaid and killed on the way by Turkmen raiders. His estates were then claimed by the Mengujekid emir Bahramshah.

References

Sources
 

1192 deaths
12th-century Byzantine people
Byzantine defectors
People from the Sultanate of Rum
Viziers
Gabras family
Year of birth unknown
Converts to Islam from Eastern Orthodoxy